Abandoned Love Records is an independent record label, founded in 2004 in San Francisco by Jon Rooney of the independent rock band Morning Spy and solo project Virgin of the Birds. The label moved to Austin, TX in 2005 and then to Seattle, WA in August 2007. The label specializes in Indie rock, Lo-fi music, Dream pop, and instrumental music. Abandoned Love Records took their name from a Bob Dylan song, titled Abandoned Love.

Bands and Artists 

 The Capstan Shafts
 Grumpy Bear
 Like Pioneers
 The Lovely Sparrows
 Morning Spy
 Nire
 Parker Street Cinema
 Plot Against Rachel
 Tied to the Branches
 Virgin of the Birds

See also
Independent music
List of indie rock musicians

References

External links 
 Official site
 MySpace page

American record labels
Record labels established in 2004